Town and country planning in the United Kingdom is the part of English land law which concerns land use planning. Its goal is to ensure sustainable economic development and a better environment. Each country of the United Kingdom has its own planning system that is responsible for town and country planning, which outside of England is devolved to the Northern Ireland Assembly, the Scottish Parliament and the Senedd.

History
The roots of the UK town and country planning system as it emerged in the immediate post-war years lay in concerns developed over the previous half century in response to industrialisation and urbanisation. The particular concerns were pollution, urban sprawl, and ribbon development. These concerns were expressed through the work of thinkers such as Ebenezer Howard and the philanthropic actions of industrialists such as the Lever Brothers and the Cadbury family, and architects such as Raymond Unwin, PRIBA, and Patrick Abercrombie.

The Housing and Town Planning Act 1909, the Housing and Town Planning Act 1919, the Town Planning Act 1925 and the Town and Country Planning Act 1932 were initial moves toward modern urban planning legislation.

By the outbreak of Second World War, thinking was sufficiently advanced that a ministry was established on 7 February 1943 under William Morrison, the former Postmaster-General. During the war, a series of Royal commissions looked into specific problems in urban planning and development control. These included:

 The Barlow Commission (1940) into the distribution of industrial population
 The Scott Committee into rural land use (1941)
 The Uthwatt Committee into compensation and betterment (1942)
 The Reith Report into New Towns (1947)

Also, Patrick Abercrombie developed the Greater London Plan for the reconstruction of London, which envisaged moving 1.5 million people from London to new and expanded towns. These intellectual efforts resulted in the New Towns Act 1946 and the Town and Country Planning Act 1947.

Modern planning
The 1947 Act, in effect, nationalised the right to develop land. It required all proposals, with a few exceptions, to secure planning permission from the local authority, with provision to appeal against refusal.  It introduced a development charge to capture the planning gain which arises when permission to develop land is granted. This was abolished by the 1954 Town and Country Planning Act passed under subsequent Conservative government. Green belts were added in 1955 via a government circular. Furthermore, the 1947 Act introduced a requirement, which still exists, on local authorities to develop forward looking policy documents such as Local Plans or Unitary Development Plans to outline what kind of development is permitted where, and to mark special areas on Local Plan Maps (today referred to as policies map). It did not introduce a formal system of zoning as used in the United States. Counties developed Structure Plans that set broad targets for the wider area. Structure Plans were always problematic and were often in the process of being replaced by the time they were formally adopted.

Over the years, the planning system has undergone a number of alterations, which were consolidated in the Town and Country Planning Act 1990 (TCPA 1990). Section 106 substantially re-wrote Section 52 from the former Act, settling the concept of agreements (known as "planning obligation agreements," or more commonly "Section 106 agreements"), under which the developer is subject to detailed arrangements and restrictions beyond those that a planning condition could impose, or by which they make agreed financial contributions beyond the immediate building works to offset development effects on the local community. This was soon amended to allow a developer to self-impose obligations to preempt objections to planning permission. This prevents the planning authority from blocking a permission by merely failing to negotiate.

Three further Acts related to planning are associated with this primary act: The Planning (Listed Buildings and Conservation Areas) Act 1990, the Planning (Hazardous Substances) Act 1990, and the Planning (Consequential Provisions) Act 1990. These four Acts are referred to as the Planning Acts. Almost immediately after parliament passed these Acts, the government had further thoughts on the control of land development, which led to the Planning and Compensation Act 1991, which made important alterations to many of the Planning Acts provisions.

The Planning and Compulsory Purchase Act 2004 made substantial changes to the English Development Plan system.  It did away with both Structure Plans and Local Plans, in favour of Local Development Frameworks (LDFs), which are made up a number of Local Development Documents (LDDs) and Supplementary Planning Documents (SPDs).  The Regional Spatial Strategy (RSS), which is produced by Regional Assemblies in England, replaces the Structure Plan as the strategic planning document (i.e., the RSS that's targets for housing and employment development within each district in a Region in the future).  A variation on this approach exists in Wales.

Local Authorities are also now required to produce Local Development Schemes (LDS) – which outline the work the LDDs/SPDs they intend to produce over a three-year period, and Statements of Community Involvement (SCI), which outline how the Council will involve the local community.  All LDDs and SPDs also have to be accompanied by a Sustainability Appraisal (SA) and a Strategic Environmental Assessment (SEA).  The SEA is a requirement under European Union laws. Planning Policy Guidance Notes are also being gradually replaced by Planning Policy Statements.

Minor variations were allowed to planning permissions, recognising that information provided for planning permission does not provide enough detail for actual construction. Working drawings are required first, and architects often make small changes to accommodate a building's technical requirements. Also, plans might change on site to overcome unforeseen problems. Legality of minor amendments was challenged in 2006, and central government advice to many local authorities was that any variation to a planning permission should require planning approval.

The Localism Act 2011 introduced wide-ranging changes to the planning system in England. The bill introduced legal provision under which local communities (led by parish councils or neighbourhood forums) could develop neighbourhood plans. Similar to development management documents produced by the local authority, neighbourhood plans have statutory weight, so that they are considered in the determination of planning applications.

Online access

Historically, planning applications were submitted in paper form to designated Council offices and displayed for a statutory period at public libraries or offices. In December 1995, the London Borough of Wandsworth created a website that published electronic images of planning application documents.  This technology greatly improved access to application-related documents for all participants in the planning process.  Within ten years, most planning authorities within the UK followed suit. Other access methods now include routing inquiries through a centrally-hosted public or privately hosted website, such as UKPlanning or the national Planning Portal.

Appeals
An applicant may appeal against a refusal of planning permission. A neighbour who objects to an application has no right of appeal, but may appeal to the local authority ombudsman if they can make a case of maladministration by the local authority. In such a case the ombudsman has no powers to enforce a retraction of the permission, but it may sanction the local authority. Appeals can be made:

In England, to the Secretary of State for Communities and Local Government.
In Northern Ireland, to the Planning Appeals Commission.
In Scotland, to the Scottish Government; Directorate for Planning & Environmental Appeals or a Local Review Body of the local planning authority.
In Wales, to the Assembly.

In England and Wales the appeal is heard by a planning inspector, while in Scotland this role is filled by a reporter. There has often been talk of making the inspectors independent of government ministers, as in the Planning Appeals Commission in Northern Ireland.

Use classes

The requirement to obtain planning permission extends not only to new construction, but also some changes of use of a property. To simplify this the Government from time to time publishes a Use Classes Order. Planning permission is not normally required for a change of use within a Class but change of use to a different Use Class generally requires permission. Separate Orders are made in respect of England, Scotland and Wales. 

In all cases the appropriate Class is determined by the 'primary purpose' of the use  and a use may have other elements that are different but ‘ordinarily incidental’. For example, a restaurant may have some takeaway sales.  The use of some properties is also limited by conditions imposed on the original planning permission. 

Use Classes England

Use Classes in England were extensively revised on 1st September 2020 (he revisions do not apply to Wales). The new Order introduced a new Class E encompassing most business, retail and similar uses replacing the previous Classes A1, A2, A3 and B1, B2 as well as parts of the old Class D (such as health uses and day nurseries). The new Class reads

Class E. Commercial, Business and Service

Use, or part use, for all or any of the following purposes—

(a)for the display or retail sale of goods, other than hot food, principally to visiting members of the public,
(b)for the sale of food and drink principally to visiting members of the public where consumption of that food and drink is mostly undertaken on the premises,
(c)for the provision of the following kinds of services principally to visiting members of the public—
(i)financial services,
(ii)professional services (other than health or medical services), or
(iii)any other services which it is appropriate to provide in a commercial, business or service locality,
(d)for indoor sport, recreation or fitness, not involving motorised vehicles or firearms, principally to visiting members of the public,
(e)for the provision of medical or health services, principally to visiting members of the public, except the use of premises attached to the residence of the consultant or practitioner,
(f)for a creche, day nursery or day centre, not including a residential use, principally to visiting members of the public,
(g)for—
(i)an office to carry out any operational or administrative functions,
(ii)the research and development of products or processes, or
(iii)any industrial process, being a use, which can be carried out in any residential area without detriment to the amenity of that area by reason of noise, vibration, smell, fumes, smoke, soot, ash, dust or grit.

It also introduced a new Class F1 and F2 replacing those uses from the previous Class D1 and D2 that had not been swept up into Class E. Class F2 is unusual in that it separates certain small local shops from Class E. The Order reads

Class F.1 Learning and non-residential institutions

Any use not including residential use—
(a)for the provision of education,
(b)for the display of works of art (otherwise than for sale or hire),
(c)as a museum,
(d)as a public library or public reading room,
(e)as a public hall or exhibition hall,
(f)for, or in connection with, public worship or religious instruction,
(g)as a law court.

Class F.2 Local community

Use as—
(a)a shop mostly selling essential goods, including food, to visiting members of the public in circumstances where—
(i)the shop’s premises cover an area not more than 280 metres square, and
(ii)there is no other such facility within 1000 metre radius of the shop’s location,
(b)a hall or meeting place for the principal use of the local community,
(c)an area or place for outdoor sport or recreation, not involving motorised vehicles or firearms,
(d)an indoor or outdoor swimming pool or skating rink.”.

As before, a number of uses are deemed sui generis (in themselves) and planning permission is required for any change of use to or from such uses. The list 
excludes. Theatres. Amusement arcades/centres or funfairs. Launderettes. Petrol filling stations. Hiring, selling and/or displaying motor vehicles. Taxi businesses. Scrap yards (or for the storage/distribution of minerals and/or the breaking of motor vehicles). Any work registerable under the Alkali, etc. Works Regulation Act 1906 (as amended)). Hostels (providing no significant element of care. Waste disposal installations for the incineration, chemical treatment or landfill of hazardous waste. Retail warehouse clubs. Nightclubs. Casinos. Betting offices/shops. Pay day loan shops. Public houses, wine bars, or drinking establishments (previously Class A4). Drinking establishments with expanded food provision (previously Class A4. Note a restaurant Is Class E). Hot food takeaways (Previously Class A5. Hot food to eat in is of course a restaurant, Class E). Venues for live music performance. Cinemas. Concert halls. Bingo halls Dance halls.)

Prior to September 2020 the Use Classes for England and Wales were:

A1: shops
A2: financial and professional services
A3: restaurants and cafés
A4: drinking establishments
A5: hot food takeaways
B1: businesses (offices, light industry)
B2: general industrial
B8: storage and distribution 
C1: hotels
C2: residential institutions
C3: dwellinghouses
C4: house in multiple occupation (HMO or HiMO)
D1: non-residential institutions (schools, libraries, surgeries)
D2: assembly and leisure (cinemas, swimming baths, gymnasiums)

Classes A3 to A5 were formed in the 2005 amendment by a split of the previous A3 class 'Food and Drink', though this split was not effected in Wales; jurisdiction over secondary planning legislation being by then a matter for the Assembly.

V

Development control

A key part of planning control is exercised in the UK by preventing any significant development of property without permission by the local authority. In Part III of the Town and Country Planning Act 1990, under section 59 the Secretary of State delegates to public bodies the right to grant planning permission.

Elements of the modern system
 The Town and Country Planning (Control of Advertisements) (England) Regulations 2007
Department for Communities and Local Government
Local Planning Authority
Advisory team for large applications
Planning and Compulsory Purchase Act 2004
General Permitted Development Order
National Planning Policy Framework, replacing the Planning Policy Guidance Notes and Planning Policy Statements
Design and access statement

Main legislation
Town and Country Planning Act 1990, for England and Wales, plus the Town and Country Planning (Scotland) Act 1997 and the Planning etc (Scotland) Act 2006 and the Planning Act (Northern Ireland) 2011
Planning and Compulsory Purchase Act 2004
Planning Act 2008
Localism Act 2011

A long list of other unconsolidated Acts and Regulations also affect UK planning. For example, the Localism Act 2011 abolished the Infrastructure Planning Commission for national projects, set up by the Planning Act 2008 and recentralised control in the hands of the Secretary of State.

Criticism
The aim of recent reforms to the planning system was to simplify and speed up the production of plans. The financial costs and time delays associated with the new system are significant and the Barker Review of Housing Supply (2004) on the planning system suggested some of the requirements were unnecessary and delaying the delivery of sustainable and social housing, and recommended early revisions to the regulations. HM Treasury noted the recommendation to redirect a portion of Section 106 financial contributions as a "planning gain supplement"" for wider community needs and has responded by an Act of Parliament that will levy "a tax on the increase in the value of land resulting from the grant of permission for development".

Planning Green Paper
Planning white paper (Scotland): Modernising the planning system

See also
Landscape planning
Regional planning
Royal Town Planning Institute
Town and Country Planning Association
Building regulations in the United Kingdom
Planning gain
Listed Building
Scheduled monument
Conservation Area (United Kingdom)

References

Further reading

External links
The Planning Portal – the UK government's online planning and building regulations resource
Department for Communities and Local Government (England)
Scottish Executive – Planning and Building
The Planning Service (Northern Ireland)
GamePlan – A Lean Construction principles
Planning Process and EIA

English land law
Housing in the United Kingdom
Law of the United Kingdom
 
Towns in the United Kingdom